(1559 – August 18, 1598) was a Japanese samurai of the Sengoku and Azuchi-Momoyama periods. Akamastu clan was  the shugo daimyō of Harima Province. His father was Akamatsu Yoshisuke.

Norifusa was defeated during Toyotomi Hideyoshi's Chugoku Offensive. He surrendered, becoming Hideyoshi's vassal; in subsequent years he was granted landholdings scattered around Okishio castle and Sumakichi (in Awa Province). 

Under Hideyoshi's command, he saw action at the Battle of Shizugatake (1583) and the Invasion of Shikoku (1585).

Notes

External links
Biography of Akamatsu Norifusa (in Japanese)

1559 births
1598 deaths
Daimyo
Samurai